Lin Bin (born 1961) is a Chinese entrepreneur, co-founder and vice president of Xiaomi.

Lin Bin graduated from the radio electronics department of the Sun Yat-sen University. Later he received a master of science in computer science from Drexel University. After graduation, Lin Bin started at Microsoft, where he worked on Internet Explorer. From 2006 to 2010, Lin Bin worked as an engineering director at Google. In 2010, together with Lei Jun, they founded Xiaomi. In 2019, he became the vice president of the company.

Lin Bin made the 2022 Forbes Billionaires List with an estimated wealth of $5.1 billion and occupied the 536th position.

References 

1961 births
Living people
Chinese businesspeople
Chinese billionaires
20th-century Chinese businesspeople
21st-century Chinese businesspeople
Drexel University alumni